The Annamese langur (Trachypithecus margarita) is an Old World monkey from the Colobinae subfamily.  It was formerly considered a subspecies of Trachypithecus germaini until it was elevated to a separate species by Roos and Groves in 2008.  Its fur is lighter in colour than that of Trachypithecus germaini.  Its range includes parts of Cambodia, Laos and Vietnam.

References

Trachypithecus
Mammals of Cambodia
Mammals of Laos
Mammals of Vietnam
Mammals described in 1909
Taxa named by Daniel Giraud Elliot